Raffaele Soprani (1612-1672) was an Italian aristocrat known mainly as an art historian for his volume of biographies of Genoese artists, published posthumously in 1674.

Biography
He was born to a senatorial family in Genoa, and himself served twice as a Senator. Educated in the humanities, he also dabbled in painting, studying under Giulio Benso and Pellegro Piola. He confessed being attracted to the styles of Sinibaldo Scorza and Goffredo Waals. His friendship with Benso, and the popularity of Vasari's biographies, led Soprani to collect the information about Ligurian painters, sculptors, and architects. His first synthesis was complete by about 1657, but he continued to revise the manuscript. A second volume was added by Carlo Giuseppe Ratti.

He also published books on the writers of Liguria and select biographies.

Bibliography
Delle vite de' Pittori, scultori ed Architetti Genovesi
Li Scrittori della Liguria, e particolarmente della maritima (1667)
Vita della Venerabile Suor Tomasa Fiesca
Trattato delle Antiche medaglie
Vite della Veneatile Donna Anna Soprani

References

1612 births
1674 deaths
Nobility from Genoa
17th-century Italian writers
Writers from Genoa
Italian art historians